Ketelaar is a Dutch surname. Notable people with the surname include:

Digna Ketelaar (born 1967), Dutch tennis player
Jan Ketelaar (1908–2001), Dutch chemist and author

Dutch-language surnames